Events from the year 1838 in Sweden

Incumbents
 Monarch – Charles XIV John

Events
 7 March – Jenny Lind as her breakthrough in Der Freischütz by Carl Maria von Weber at the Royal Swedish Opera in Stockholm.
 The state licensed brothels, London and Stadt Hamburg, open in the capital in an attempt by the city authorities to control the spread of sexual disease.
 - Rabulist riots
 - First issue of Borås Tidning
 - First issue of Östgöta Correspondenten
 - Foundation of the philanthropic sewing society by Emilie Petersen.

Births
 20 July – Paul Peter Waldenström, theologian  (died 1917) 
 14 September - Hanna Ouchterlony, Salvationist  (died 1924)
 4 December - Hanna Winge, painter   (died 1896) 
  - Hilda Petrini, watch maker (died 1895) 
  - Betty Pettersson, first female university student (died 1885) 
  - Hedvig Raa-Winterhjelm, actress and drama teacher   (died 1907)
  - Axel Elmlund, ballet dancer and stage actor (died 1901)

Deaths

References

 
Years of the 19th century in Sweden
Sweden